A supervisory program or supervisor is a computer program, usually part of an operating system, that controls the execution of other routines and regulates work scheduling, input/output operations, error actions, and similar functions and regulates the flow of work in a data processing system. 

It can also refer to a program that allocates computer component space and schedules computer events by task queuing and system interrupts. Control of the system is returned to the supervisory program frequently enough to ensure that demands on the system are met.

Historically, this term was essentially associated with IBM's line of mainframe operating systems starting with OS/360. In other operating systems, the supervisor is generally called the kernel.

In the 1970s, IBM further abstracted the supervisor state from the hardware, resulting in a hypervisor that enabled full virtualization, i.e. the capacity to run multiple operating systems on the same machine totally independently from each other. Hence the first such system was called Virtual Machine or VM.

References

Operating system technology